Onchulidae is a family of nematodes belonging to the order Enoplida.

Genera:
 Caprionchulus Swart & Heyns, 1993
 Cupostomella Siddiqi, 2013
 Euronchulus Siddiqi, 2013
 Holovachovius Siddiqi, 2013
 Kinonchulus Riemann, 1972
 Tobrilonchulus Holovachov, Winiszewska, Sturhan, Esquivel & Wu, 2008

References

Nematode families